The second season of the American military drama television series SEAL Team premiered on CBS on October 3, 2018, and concluded on May 22, 2019. A total of 22 episodes were produced.

Cast and characters

Main 
 David Boreanaz as Master Chief Special Warfare Operator Jason Hayes a.k.a. Bravo 1/1B
 Max Thieriot as Special Warfare Operator Second Class Clay Spenser a.k.a. Bravo 6/6B
 Jessica Paré as Amanda "Mandy" Ellis
 Neil Brown Jr. as Senior Chief Special Warfare Operator Raymond "Ray" Perry, a.k.a. Bravo 2/2B
 A. J. Buckley as Special Warfare Operator First Class Sonny Quinn a.k.a. Bravo 3/3B
 Toni Trucks as Ensign Lisa Davis
 Judd Lormand as Lieutenant Commander Eric Blackburn

Recurring 
 Tyler Grey as Special Warfare Operator First Class Trent Sawyer a.k.a. Bravo 4/4B
 Jusitin Melnick as Special Warfare Operator First Class Brock Reynolds a.k.a. Bravo 5/5B
 Michaela McManus as Alana Hayes
 Kerri Medders as Emma Hayes
 Parisa Fakhri as Naima Perry
 Ammon Jacob Ford as Michael "Mikey" Hayes
 Alona Tal as Stella Baxter
 Michael Irby as Master Chief Special Warfare Operator Adam Siever
 Scott Foxx as Senior Chief Special Warfare Operator Scott "Full Metal" Carter a.k.a. Alpha 1/1A
 Ruffin Prentiss as Navy Explosive Ordnance Disposal technician Summer Kairos
 Michael McGrady as Captain Harrington,
 Mirelly Taylor as Rita Alfaro, a CISEN agent serving as Mandy's liaison for the team's operations in Mexico.
 Felix Solis as Colonel Martinez
 Bobby Daniel Rodriguez as Lieutenant Lopez

Guest 
 Tony Curran as Retired Senior Chief Special Warfare Operator Brett Swann
 Note:

Episodes

Production

Development 
On March 27, 2018, CBS renewed the series for a second season. On May 22, 2018, it was reported that both Cavell and Redlich were exiting their roles as executive producer and showrunner, and John Glenn replacing him as showrunner.

Casting 
On August 8, 2018, it was announced that Michael McGrady and Ruffin Prentiss would recur as Captain Harrington and Summer Kairos in the series' second season. On August 15, 2018 it was reported that Judd Lormand had been upgraded to series regular for season 2.

Ratings

Home media

References

2018 American television seasons
2019 American television seasons